Muhammad Zulqarnaen bin Suzliman (born 29 March 1998) is a Singaporean professional footballer who plays as a full-back for Singapore Premier League club Lion City Sailors and the Singapore national team.

Club career

Young Lions
Zulqarnaen made his professional debut for Young Lions in a 2-0 Singapore Premier League loss to Geylang International FC on 25 February 2016.

Lion City Sailors

2021–2022: Loan to Police SA and Young Lions
Zulqarnaen signed for the Lion City Sailors in 2020. Zulqarnaen was loaned to Young Lions following his national service commitments.

2022 season
Zulqarnaen returned to his parent club Lion City Sailors from Young Lions on 11 June 2022 after completing his national service.

International career
Zulqarnaen made his professional debut for the Singapore national football team in a friendly 2-0 win over Fiji on 19 September 2018.

Zulqarnaen made his AFF Championship debut in the 2018 campaign on 9 November, with a 1-0 win over Indonesia.

On 21 November, Zulqarnaen started and played 90 minutes in Singapore's 6-1 win over Timor Leste in the AFF Suzuki Cup.

Career statistics

Club

International

International caps

U22 International caps

U19 International caps

U16 International caps
He was called up to the National U16 team for the 2014 Asian Football Confederation (AFC) Under-16 Championship qualifiers.

U16 International goals
Scores and results list Singapore's goal tally first.

Personal life
Suliman's brothers, Zulkifli, Zulfadhli, Zulfadhmi, are all footballers in Singapore.

Honours

International
Singapore U22
 Merlion Cup: 2019

Others

Singapore Selection Squad
He was selected as part of the Singapore Selection squad for The Sultan of Selangor’s Cup to be held on 24 August 2019.

References

External links
 
 

1998 births
Living people
Singaporean footballers
Singapore international footballers
Young Lions FC players
Singapore Premier League players
Association football midfielders
Competitors at the 2019 Southeast Asian Games
Lion City Sailors FC players
Southeast Asian Games competitors for Singapore